Adam Cushing (born May 29, 1980) is an American college football coach. He is currently the offensive line coach at Duke University. Cushing served was the head football coach at Eastern Illinois University from 2019 to 2021, compiling a record of 3–26. A native of Chicago, Cushing played college football at the University of Chicago.

Head coaching record

References

External links
 Duke profile

1980 births
Date of birth missing (living people)
Living people
American football tight ends
Chicago Maroons football players
Duke Blue Devils football coaches
Eastern Illinois Panthers football coaches
La Verne Leopards football coaches
Northwestern Wildcats football coaches
Coaches of American football from Illinois
Players of American football from Chicago